The Race Relations (Amendment) Act 2000 is an Act of the Parliament of the United Kingdom that modified the earlier Race Relations Act 1976.

The legislation outlawed race discrimination in areas not covered by the 1976 legislation. This included the introduction of a broader definition of "public authorities" to cover public functions performed by private organisations. Furthermore it required public authorities to promote racial equality and allowed the Home Secretary to extend the list of public bodies required to promote race equality, and to impose specific duties on those bodies. This was buttressed by the Commission for Racial Equality being empowered to enforce those duties and to issue codes of practice on how public bodies should fulfil their specific and general duties.

The act also introduced some more specific regulations relating to education (discrimination claims against educational bodies to be brought to court immediately) and the police (chief police officers became liable for discrimination carried out by their officers).

Finally, government ministers could no longer issue conclusive certificates in cases of racial discrimination by claiming given acts of race discrimination were not unlawful because they were done for the purposes of national security.

References

United Kingdom Acts of Parliament 2000
Anti-discrimination law in the United Kingdom
Race relations in the United Kingdom